Nooruddin Ahmed (born 6 January 1941) is a Bangladeshi academic. He served as the 8th vice-chancellor of Bangladesh University of Engineering and Technology (BUET).

Education

Ahmed passed matriculation examination from Armanitola Government High School and intermediate examination from Dhaka College in 1955 and 1957 respectively. He earned his bachelor's in chemical engineering in 1961 from the Ahsanullah Engineering College. He obtained his master's and Ph.D. from the University of Saskatchewan in Canada  in 1964 and 1968 respectively under Commonwealth Scholarship. He was a post-doctoral fellow at the NASA Interdisciplinary Materials Research Centre and Rensselaer Polytechnic Institute (RPI) in the United States from 1968 to 1969.

Career
Ahmed joined East Pakistan University of Engineering and Technology (EPUET) as an assistant professor of chemical engineering in 1969. He was appointed a professor in 1976. He served as the vice-chancellor of BUET from October 14, 1998, until August 30, 2002.

References

Living people
1941 births
Dhaka College alumni
Bangladesh University of Engineering and Technology alumni
University of Saskatchewan alumni
Academic staff of Bangladesh University of Engineering and Technology
Vice-Chancellors of Bangladesh University of Engineering and Technology